Philip Brennan (born 1983) is a hurler for Dublin and O'Tooles. Philip captained Dublin to victory against Westmeath in the 2006 Liam MacCarthy Cup and has continued his role as Dublin Senior Hurling captain in 2007. The victory insured Dublins place in the 2007 Liam MacCarthy Cup. Brennan won a Dublin Senior Hurling Championship medal with O'Tooles in 2002.

Philip won an All-Ireland Under-21 Football Championship medal with Dublin in 2003.

1983 births
Living people
Dual players
Dublin inter-county Gaelic footballers
Dublin inter-county hurlers
O'Tooles Gaelic footballers
O'Tooles hurlers
Sportspeople from Dublin (city)